Helicina orbiculata is a species of land snail with an operculum, a terrestrial gastropod mollusk in the family Helicinidae. They are one of few land snail species to have eyes at the base of their tentacles. This may suggest that Helicina orbiculata individuals are separate male and female, as opposed to the more common hermaphroditic land snails.

Distribution
This species lives in north-eastern Mexico, Texas, and Florida; especially the northern half of the Florida panhandle, and the central part of Texas, or the parts with a more tropical/subtropical climate. They will survive in areas that have occasional freezes, most likely by burrowing and resurfacing when the ground saturates in the spring. They are drought tolerant but less so than some more well known (although larger) terrestrial snail species.

References

Further reading 
 Ideker J. (1979). The Associated Gastropod Fauna of the Santa Ana National Wildlife Refuge with Notes on a Colony of the Snail, Helicina orbiculata". The Southwestern Naturalist 24(4): 687-689. JSTOR

Helicinidae
Gastropods described in 1818